Amir Muhammed (Born: 21 November 1931; Urdu:امیر محمد) is the Founding Rector and Chairman Board of Governors of National University of Computer and Emerging Sciences. Previously, he was President Pakistan Academy of Sciences. He was appointed Vice Chancellor of University of Agriculture (Faisalabad) in 1974 in the wake of food crisis in Pakistan. In 1978, he was appointed as Founder-Chairman of Pakistan Agricultural Research Council where he served till 1990.

Positions held
 Founder/Chairman, Pakistan Agricultural Research Council (PARC) (1978 – 1990)
 Federal Secretary, Ministry of Agriculture (Pakistan) (1978 – 1990)
 Advisor to the President of Pakistan (1977 – 1978)
 Vice-Chancellor, University of Agriculture, Faisalabad (1974 – 1978)
 Director, Nuclear Institute for Agriculture and Biology (NIAB), Faisalabad (1969 – 1974)
 Senior Research Officer, Pakistan Council of Scientific and Industrial Research (PCSIR), Lahore (1959 – 1961)

References

External links
Pakistan Journal of Botany

1931 births
Living people
Founders of Pakistani schools and colleges
Pakistani agriculturalists
People from Hoshiarpur district
Vice-Chancellors of the University of Agriculture, Faisalabad
Fellows of Pakistan Academy of Sciences
Presidents of the Pakistan Academy of Sciences